Maxime Vachier-Lagrave (born 21 October 1990), often referred to by his initials, MVL,  is a French chess grandmaster who is a former World Blitz Chess Champion. With a peak rating of 2819, Vachier-Lagrave is the seventh-highest rated player in history.

A chess prodigy, Vachier-Lagrave earned the title of grandmaster in 2005, at age 14. In 2007, Vachier-Lagrave won the French Chess Championship, and in 2009, won the World Junior Chess Championship and the Biel Grandmaster Tournament. He repeated as French Chess Champion in 2011 and 2012 and as the winner of the Biel Grandmaster Tournament in 2013, 2014, 2015 and 2016. Vachier-Lagrave won the Sinquefield Cup in 2017 and 2021 and competed in the Candidates Tournament 2020–21, placing second.

Vachier-Lagrave has participated in the Chess Olympiad and in the European Team Chess Championship, representing France.

Early life 

From the age of six, Vachier-Lagrave competed in numerous sections of youth tournaments, winning the French Under-8 championship in 1997, U-10s in 1999, U-12s in 2000, U-16s in 2002, runner up in the U-18s in 2003 and won the U-20s in 2004 scoring 8/9.

He also took part in the World Youth Chess Championship, coming third in the U-10 division in 2000 (8½/11), third in the U-12 championship in 2001 (8/11), second in the U-14 event in 2003 (9/11) and third in U-16 section in 2005 (8½/11).

From 2001 to 2008, his FIDE rating increased steadily from 2198 in January 2001 to 2637 in January 2008. Vachier-Lagrave passed 2600 in October 2007 and 2700 one year later.

He became an International Master in 2004 and achieved the Grandmaster title in 2005 at the age of 14 years and 4 months after sharing first in the 2004 Paris Championship with 6½/9, winning the NAO GM tournament in 2004 with 6/9 and coming second in the Évry GM tournament in February 2005 with 7½/9.

Chess career

French Championships 
 2004: Winner of the French Junior Championship (U20).
 In 2005, Vachier-Lagrave finished in third place at the French Chess Championship with 7/11.
 Besançon 2006: finished 5th at the French Championship with 6 points out of 11 and a TPR of 2608.
 Winner of 2007 French Championship after beating GM Vladislav Tkachiev in tiebreak match. In the main tournament he collected 7.5 out of 11.
 Winner of the 2011 and 2012 French Championships.

Classical international tournaments 
 2006: Aeroflot Open, Moscow: played the A1 (main) tournament, reserved for players having a rating superior to 2550. He finished sixth with 6 points out of 9 and a TPR of 2775.

 Young Masters, Lausanne 2006: being the youngest player invited, won the tournament with a TPR of 2630.
 2007: Corus tournament B, Wijk aan Zee: finished 5th with 8 points out of 13.
 Winner of the 2007 and 2008 Paris City Chess Championships with 7 points out of 9.
 2008: 2nd-10th place at the European Individual Chess Championship with 8 points out of 13
 Winner of the 2008 Gregory Marx Memorial in Paks, with 7 points out of 10.
 Winner of the 2009 Biel Grandmaster Tournament with 6 points out of 10 ahead of Morozevich and Ivanchuk.
 Winner of the 2009 World Junior Chess Championship.
 Winner of the 2010 Hoogeveen tournament.
 Winner of the 2012 SPICE Cup Festival at Webster University with 6 points out of 10 ahead of Lê Quang Liêm, Ding Liren, Wesley So, Georg Meier, and Csaba Balogh.
 2012: 1st-2nd of the first Al Ain Classic, second on tie-break (number of wins).
 2013: In the Alekhine Memorial tournament, held from 20 April to 1 May in Paris, Vachier-Lagrave finished eighth, with +2−2=5.
Winner of the 2013 Biel Grandmaster Tournament (+3 -2 =5) after a tie-break against three players (Moiseenko, Bacrot and Ding Liren).
Winner of the 2014 Biel Grandmaster Tournament with 6 points out of 10 ahead of Radosław Wojtaszek.
2014: Scored 4/10 (fourth place) in the Sinquefield Cup 2014 in Saint Louis, USA, the strongest chess tournament ever held in the history of chess.
2015: 2nd place in the Tata Steel Chess Tournament.
Winner of the 2015 Biel Grandmaster Tournament with 6.5 points out of 10 ahead of Radosław Wojtaszek. 4th victory in Biel and 3rd consecutive victory.
2015: Fourth place at the 3rd Sinquefield Cup
2015: Third place at the London Chess Classic
2016: Second Place at the Gibraltar Chess Festival after a tie-break against Hikaru Nakamura.
 Winner of the 2016 Dortmund Sparkassen Chess Meeting with 5.5 points out of 7. Ahead of multiple-time previous winners Vladimir Kramnik and Fabiano Caruana.
2017: 2nd-3rd place at the Dortmund Sparkassen Chess Meeting.
 Winner of the 2017 Sinquefield Cup with 6 points out of 9 (+3=6).
2018: Second Place at the Gibraltar Chess Festival after a tie-break against Levon Aronian.
2018: Third place at the 5th Grenke Chess Classic with a score of 5/9 (+2–1=6).
2018: Eighth place at the sixth edition of Norway Chess, with a score of 3/8 (+0–2=6).
Winner of the 2018 Shenzhen Masters on tiebreak, with a score of 5.5/10 (+1=9), defeating Ding Liren in their direct encounter (1.5-0.5).
2019: Fourth place at the 6th Grenke Chess Classic with a score of 5/9 (+2–1=6).
 Winner of the 2021 Sinquefield Cup with 6 points out of 9 (+4–1=4), being the first person to win clear first place twice and the first to win the event after losing one game.

FIDE Grand Prix and World Cups 
2009: 9th-16th at the Chess World Cup 2009.
2013: Semifinalist at the Chess World Cup 2013.
2014–2015
 4th-7th place at the FIDE Grand Prix 2014–15 stage in Tashkent.
 Finished 15th (out of 16 participants) in the FIDE Grand Prix 2014–15, one of the qualifying methods of the 2016 World Chess Championship cycle.
 5th-8th (quarterfinalist) at the Chess World Cup 2015.
2017:
 Winner of the Sharjah Grand Prix (2017), with 5.5 points out of 9.
 Finished sixth (out of 24 participants) in the FIDE Grand Prix 2017
 Semifinalist at the Chess World Cup 2017, after losing the armageddon tiebreak to Levon Aronian, thus narrowly missing qualification to the Candidates Tournament 2018.
2019:
 Third place at the Chess World Cup 2019 in Khanty-Mansiysk.
 Finished third (out of 21 participants) in the FIDE Grand Prix 2019.
 Second place (finalist) at the FIDE Grand Prix 2019 stage in Riga.
 Semifinalist at the FIDE Grand Prix 2019 stage in Hamburg.
 Semifinalist at the FIDE Grand Prix 2019 stage in Jerusalem.
2021: 9th-16th at the Chess World Cup 2021.
2022:
 Semifinalist at the FIDE Grand Prix 2022 stage in Belgrade.

Candidates Tournament 2020–2021 
On March 6, citing concerns over the COVID-19 pandemic, Teimour Radjabov withdrew from the 2020–21 Candidates Tournament. His replacement was Maxime Vachier-Lagrave, as he was next on the qualifier by rating list. FIDE decided to postpone the second half of the tournament due to the coronavirus pandemic.  The tournament was resumed on April 19, 2021, and ended on April 28, 2021.

Maxime ended the tournament with 8/14 points (4 wins, 8 draws, and 2 losses) getting second place, half a point behind the winner Ian Nepomniachtchi.

Grand Chess Tour tournaments 
2015: Grand Chess Tour Participant 
 Norway Chess 2015: 4th–5th place
 joint 2nd-5th place at the 2015 Sinquefield Cup
 1st-3rd Place at the London Chess Classic, came third on Sonneborn-Berger tie-break and after a tie-break match against Magnus Carlsen.
 4th Place in the 2015 Grand Chess Tour.
2016:
 Third Place at the Paris Rapid and Blitz Grand Chess Tour Tournament with a score of 22/36
 7th Place in the 2016 Grand Chess Tour.
2017:
 Second place at the Paris Grand Chess Tour (rapid and blitz), with a score of 24/36, after a tie-break with Magnus Carlsen
 Winner of the 2017 Sinquefield Cup with 6 points out of 9 (+3=6), defeating Magnus Carlsen in their individual encounter.
 Second place at the 2017 Grand Chess Tour, behind Magnus Carlsen.
2018:
 Joint fifth through seventh place at the 2018 Sinquefield Cup, drawing all nine of his games.
 Second place at the Saint-Louis Rapid and Blitz with a score of 21,5/36
 Second place at the London Chess Classic (beats Levon Aronian in the semi-final) 2018.
 Second place at the 2018 Grand Chess Tour, behind Hikaru Nakamura.
2019:
 Second place at Côte d'Ivoire Grand Chess Tour Rapid and Blitz tournament with a score of 23/36.
 Winner of the 2019 Paris Rapid and Blitz Grand Chess Tour tournament with a score of 21/36
 Second-Fourth place in the Saint Louis Rapid and Blitz event with a score of 21.5/36. The second place was tied and shared with Ding Liren and Yu Yangyi.
 Second place at the London Chess Classic 2019 (beats Magnus Carlsen in the semi-final).
 Second place at the  2019 Grand Chess Tour, behind Ding Liren.
2021:
 Third-fourth place in the 2021 Paris Rapid and Blitz Grand Chess Tour tournament
 Winner of the Croatia Grand Chess Tour Rapid and Blitz tournament with a score of 23/36
 Winner of the Sinquefield Cup with a score of 6 points out of 9 (+4=4-1)
 Second place at the Grand Chess Tour 2021, behind Wesley So.
2022
 Winner of the Bucharest Superbet classic after a tie-break against Wesley So and Levon Aronian
 Second-Third place Poland Grand Chess Tour Rapid and Blitz with a score of 22/36
 Third-Fourth place at the Saint-Louis Rapid and Blitz with a score of 19/36
 Third place at the  Grand Chess Tour 2022, behind Alireza Firouzja and Wesley So.

Rapid, Blitz and Bullet tournaments and matches 

 Winner of the 2010 Aeroflot Open Blitz Tournament
 Winner of the 2010 European Blitz Championship.
 Winner of the 2011 SportAccord World Mind Games in Beijing
 Winner of the 2011 Quenza Blitz Open Tournament
 Winner of the 2012 Port-Marly Rapid Pyramid Grand Prix
 Winner of the 2012 Biel Blitz Tournament
 Winner of the 2012 European Blitz Championship.
 Winner of the 2013 Paris International Blitz Tournament
 Winner of the 2013 Port-Marly Rapid Pyramids Grand Prix
 Winner of the 2014 Paris International Blitz Tournament
 Winner of the 2014 Paris International Rapid Tournament
 Winner of the 2014 Venaco Casanova Rapid Open
 Winner of the 2015 Norway Chess blitz tournament with 6.5 out of 9.
 Winner of the 2015 Quenza Blitz Open Tournament
2015: Second Place at the World Blitz Championship in Berlin with 15 points out of 21, only 0.5 point behind Alexander Grischuk.
 Winner of the 2016 Ciamannacce Blitz Open Tournament
 Winner of the 2016 Biel Masters Challenge Rapid match against Svidler
 Winner of the 2016 Corsica Masters (rapid), beat Anand in the final.
2016: Sixth Place at the World Blitz Championship in Doha with 14 points out of 21.
2019: Third place in Chess.com's Bullet Chess Championship, behind runner-up  Oleksandr Bortnyk and Hikaru Nakamura, the winner. 
 Winner of the 2019 Norway Chess blitz tournament with 7.5 out of 9.
2019: Fifth Place at the World Blitz Championship in Moscow with 14 points out of 21.
 Winner of the 2021 World Blitz Championship in Warsaw with 15 points out of 21.

Teams
Vachier-Lagrave played in the French team championship with the NAO Chess Club teams since 1997. Team results include:
 U16 French championship 2004–2005: first board for NAO Chess Club, 7 points from 7 games. NAO-CC earned the title
 U16 French championship 2005–2006: first board for NAO Chess Club, 7 points from 7 games. NAO-CC again earned the title
 Top 16 2006: NAO team, 6½ points from 8 games. NAO-CC won the championship for the fourth time in a row (2003 to 2006)
He played for the Évry Grand Roque chess club in 2008, 2009 and 2010. Since 2011, he plays for the Clichy club chess team in the Top12.

In the European Chess Club Cup, he played with SV Mülheim Nord (in 2008), SOCAR Baku (in 2010),  Clichy Échecs 92 (in 2013) and Obiettivo Risarcimento Padova (2014–2016).

Rapid and blitz rankings 
In addition to his strength in classical time controls, Vachier-Lagrave is very skilled at rapid and blitz chess.  Maxime ranked fourth on the FIDE rapid list and also fourth on the blitz list.

Personal life
Vachier-Lagrave also teaches chess on his personal YouTube channel, MVL Chess, in addition to maintaining a blog.

References

External links
 
 
 
 
 
 
 
 
 Maxime Vachier-Lagrave  player profile and games at Chess-DB.com

1990 births
Living people
Chess grandmasters
Chess Olympiad competitors
French chess players
World Junior Chess Champions
People from Nogent-sur-Marne
Sportspeople from Val-de-Marne